SGS (New Zealand) Ltd v Quirke Export Ltd [1988] 1 NZLR 52 CA  is a leading case in New Zealand regarding limitation clauses contained in contracts.

Background
Quirke Export exported 2 shipments of onions to Taiwan. The size of the onions were important, with the onions required to be of a minimum size of between 2.25 and 2.5 inches, in order to suit the processing equipment in fast food restaurants.

In order that the onions exported were not smaller than this size, they hired SGS to certify the onions did not exceed the minimum allowable size.

SGS were employed on the basis that any liability for damages was limited to a maximum of 10 times the SGS inspection fee charged, with the clause stating "The company's responsibility under this certificate is limited to gross negligence proven by Principals and will in no case be more than 10 times fees or commissions".

In 1983 SGS issued inspection certificates for 2 shipments of onions, charging $125, where upon delivery in Taiwan, were discovered to be outside the size requirements allowed, with 26% of the first shipment being found undersized, and the 76% of the second shipment.

It was subsequently discovered that SGS had issued the inspection certificates without first inspecting the onions, which the court later held as gross negligence on SGS's part.

These undersized onions were subsequently sold at a loss, and Quirke sued SGS for damages, and the High Court awarded $35,000 in damages against SGS.

SGS appealed, claiming that in any case, their liability for damages was limited to $1,125.

Decision
The Court of Appeal ruled that the actual loss was not $35,007, but instead only $8,000. However, the court ruled that the limitation clause was valid, and reduced the damages award to $1,250.

References

Court of Appeal of New Zealand cases
1987 in New Zealand law
1987 in case law
New Zealand contract case law